Trichoscypha cavalliensis is a species of plant in the family Anacardiaceae. It is found in Ivory Coast, Ghana, and Liberia. It is threatened by habitat loss.

References

cavalliensis
Vulnerable plants
Taxonomy articles created by Polbot
Taxa named by François Pellegrin
Taxa named by André Aubréville